Robb Kahl (born January 5, 1972) is an American lawyer and politician.

From Monona, Wisconsin, Kahl graduated from Ripon College and received his J.D. degree from University of Wisconsin Law School. Kahl practiced law and served as Mayor of Monona. In November 2012, Kahl was elected to the Wisconsin State Assembly as a Democrat. Kahl announced in May 2016 that he would not seek reelection to the Wisconsin Assembly.

Notes

Living people
People from Monona, Wisconsin
Ripon College (Wisconsin) alumni
University of Wisconsin Law School alumni
Wisconsin lawyers
Mayors of places in Wisconsin
Democratic Party members of the Wisconsin State Assembly
1972 births
21st-century American politicians